Morakot Aimee Kittisara later Morakot Sangtaweep  is a Thai-British actress, model, and television presenter who won the Miss Thailand Universe pageant in 2004. She was born and raised in London, England. She attended Plashet School and Valentines Sixth Form in London before graduating from Brunel University.

Pageantry

Participation
On 27 March 2004, Morakot Kittisara was crowned the fifth Miss Thailand Universe in Bangkok, Thailand.

She then went on to represent Thailand at the 53rd Miss Universe pageant, held at the Centro de Convenciones CEMEXPO, Quito, Ecuador, on 1 June 2004, but did not place. The pageant was won by Jennifer Hawkins of Australia.

Hosting
Kittisara co-hosted a national costume competition in the Miss Universe 2005 pageant, held in Thailand. The award was won by Miss Thailand Chananporn Rosjan.

Filmography

Television

Film

References

External links
The Official Website of Morakot Aimee Kittisara
Aimee's Gallery
Crowning Moment
Sawasdee Pageant The Majestic World of Beauty Pageant

1984 births
Actresses from London
Living people
Miss Universe 2004 contestants
Morakot Sangtaweep
Morakot Sangtaweep
Morakot Sangtaweep
Morakot Sangtaweep
Morakot Sangtaweep
British people of Thai descent
Morakot Sangtaweep
Morakot Sangtaweep
British emigrants to Thailand
20th-century English women
20th-century English people
21st-century English women
21st-century English people